In architecture, wind braces are diagonal braces to tie the rafters of a roof together and prevent racking. In medieval roofs they are arched, and run from the principal rafters to catch the purlins.

References

Architectural elements